St. Anne's Roman Catholic Church is a historic church at 7231 Totem Beach Road in Marysville, Washington, United States.  It was built in 1904 and added to the National Register of Historic Places in 1976.

References

External links

 St Anne Mission

Buildings and structures in Snohomish County, Washington
Carpenter Gothic church buildings in Washington (state)
Churches on the National Register of Historic Places in Washington (state)
Roman Catholic Archdiocese of Seattle
Roman Catholic churches completed in 1904
Roman Catholic churches in Washington (state)
National Register of Historic Places in Snohomish County, Washington
20th-century Roman Catholic church buildings in the United States